The Fire Dancer (German: Die Feuertänzerin) is a 1925 German silent film directed by Robert Dinesen and starring Alfred Abel, Ruth Weyher and Carl Auen.

The film's sets were designed by the art director Willi Herrmann.

Cast
Alfred Abel as General director Godenberg 
Ruth Weyher as Malanie, his wife
Carl Auen as Holland, engineer 
Hans Heinrich von Twardowski as Bartos, his friend
Erich Kaiser-Titz as coroner 
Rosa Valetti as Portier's wife
Trude Berliner
Harry Halm
Jenny Jugo
Mary Nolan

References

External links

Films of the Weimar Republic
German silent feature films
Films directed by Robert Dinesen
German black-and-white films
Phoebus Film films